The Living Christ may refer to:

Jesus, who many Christians believe came back to life at his resurrection
The Living Christ Series, a 1951 drama film series
"The Living Christ: The Testimony of the Apostles", a 2000 declaration by leaders of The Church of Jesus Christ of Latter-day Saints
Living Christ Church, a Sri Lankan autonomous indigenous fellowship of churches